Gurbax Singh Malhi  (born 12 October 1949) is an Indian-born Canadian politician. A Liberal, he was first elected as the Member of Parliament for Bramalea—Gore—Malton in 1993, and served as its representative in the House of Commons for 18 consecutive years until his defeat in the 2011 election.

Malhi is notable for being the first turban-wearing Sikh to be elected to the House of Commons of Canada, or any national legislature in the western world.

Member of Parliament 
Malhi was first elected to the House of Commons in the federal election of 1993, defeating
Prior to 1993, Canadian law prohibited members of Parliament from wearing headgear of any sort in the House of Commons. Malhi's insistence on wearing a turban caused the law to be changed shortly after the election.

Malhi was re-elected in the 1997 election over Reform candidate Darlene Florence and PC candidate Beryl Ford. He was re-elected with the greatest majority of his career in the 2000 federal election over Canadian Alliance candidate Gurdish Mangat and PC candidate Danny Varaich. He was re-elected again with a significant plurality over Conservative Raminder Singh Gill in the 2004 election, despite the fact that his riding was a key Conservative target. In the 2006 federal election, Malhi was elected over Conservative candidate John Sprovieri and NDP candidate Cesar Martello. Malhi was elected for the sixth time in the 2008 election over Conservative candidate Stella Ambler and NDP candidate Jash Puniya.

In 2002, he became the recipient of the Queen's Golden Jubilee Medal for his commitment and contributions to Canadian society. In 2003, he was appointed for life to the Queen's Privy Council for Canada by Prime Minister Paul Martin.

Gurbax Singh Malhi served as Parliamentary Secretary to the Minister of Labour from 2001 to 2003. From 2003 to 2004, Malhi served as Parliamentary Secretary to the Minister of Industry with special emphasis on Entrepreneurs and New Canadians. In 2004 he was named Parliamentary Secretary to the Minister of Human Resources and Skills Development and he served in this capacity until 2005. In 2005, Gurbax Singh Malhi also acted as Parliamentary Secretary to the Minister of Human Resources and Skills Development and Minister responsible for Democratic Renewal. From 2005 to 2006, he also served as Parliamentary Secretary to the Minister of National Revenue.

In 2005, Malhi was among 32 Liberal Party backbenchers who voted against the Civil Marriage Act, despite the Liberal government being officially in favour of its adoption. In a House of Commons debate, he encouraged MPs to vote to maintain the definition of marriage as between one man and one woman "in keeping with the natural law and in conformity with God's design for the world" and downplayed discrimination against same-sex couples, stating that "just because differences exist in society, it does not mean that inequality and discrimination exist.”

In the 2011 federal election, the Liberal Party won the fewest seats in its history. Falling to third place, Malhi was defeated by Conservative Bal Gosal. Jagmeet Singh, the future leader of the NDP, finished in second. Like Malhi, Singh would be a trend-setter for Canadian Sikhs when he became the first turban-wearing, visible minority party leader in 2017.

During the 2014 Ontario general election, he campaigned for his daughter Harinder Malhi, who contested and won the seat for Brampton—Springdale for the Ontario Liberal Party, becoming a Member of Provincial Parliament in the 41st Legislative Assembly of Ontario.

Electoral record

Bramalea—Gore—Malton 

Source: Elections Canada

Note: Conservative vote is compared to the total of the Canadian Alliance vote and Progressive Conservative vote in 2000 election.

Bramalea—Gore—Malton—Springdale 

Note: Canadian Alliance vote is compared to the Reform vote in 1997 election.

Bramalea—Gore—Malton 

Note that all electoral information is taken from Elections Canada.

References

External links

Living people
1949 births
21st-century Canadian politicians
Canadian politicians of Indian descent
Canadian politicians of Punjabi descent
Canadian Sikhs
Indian emigrants to Canada
Liberal Party of Canada MPs
Members of the House of Commons of Canada from Ontario
Members of the King's Privy Council for Canada
Panjab University alumni
People from Punjab, India
Politicians from Brampton
Punjabi people